Professor Benjamin Oluwakayode Osuntokun (6 January 1935 – 22 September 1995), was a researcher and neurologist from Okemesi, Ekiti State, Nigeria.
Known for discovering the cause of ataxic tropical neuropathy, he was a founding member of the Pan African Association of Neurological Sciences and an early advocate and researcher on tropical neurology.

Education
He had his primary and secondary education at the Holy Trinity School, Ilawe Ekiti, the Emmanuel School, Ado Ekiti and Christ's School Ado Ekiti. After, finishing his secondary education, he studied medicine at the University College, Ibadan when it was still affiliated to the University of London.

Research and career
In 1963, he was invited by Prof Harold Scarborough to spend a year at the Welsh National School of Medicine in Cardiff.

He joined the research staff of the University College, Ibadan in 1964, as a medical research fellow. However, upon gaining a Smith and Nephew fellowship, he went abroad for further studies under the direction of Henry Miller and John Walton, both eminent neurologists in Newcastle upon Tyne. After spending some time in Newcastle, he took a job at the National Hospital for Nervous Diseases, Queens Square, London before returning to Nigeria in 1965. It was at the University of Ibadan he launched a productive career, working on neuro-epidemiology and clinical and investigative neurology especially the study of dementia among Nigerians and African Americans.

In the late 1960s, he investigated cases of ataxic neuropathy in Epe where residents usually consume a dose of ill processed cassava with little or no supplement. He then mapped out the epidemiology of the neuropathy and was able to study the basic aspects of the neuropathy. He discovered the disease was due to cyanide intoxication. At the time, little was done beyond clinical attention to the disease.  His success in discovering the basis of tropical ataxic neuropathy earned him local and international acclaim in the medical community.

Throughout his career, he wrote a number of scholarly works on his prodigious research on tropical epidemiology and was also Dean of Medicine at the University of Ibadan and later the Chief Medical Officer of that university's teaching hospital, UCH. He died in 1995 and was buried in his native Okemesi, Ekiti State.

The onset of neuropathy after ingestion of ill-processed Cassava, due to Cyanide Intoxication, is known as the Osuntokun's Sign, and is commonly used in African Medical Lectures and Bulletins, but is not much known to countries outside Africa.

Publications

Notes

References
Adeloye Adelola, Professor B. Oluwakayode Osuntokun and his Nunc Dimittis, African Journal of Neurological Sciences, (1995) Vol. 14, No 2, (letter)

External links
https://web.archive.org/web/20200607061952/https://ajns.paans.org/
https://www.ui.edu.ng/uiicons/prof-osuntokun

Academic staff of the University of Ibadan
Nigerian neurologists
1935 births
1995 deaths
University of Ibadan alumni
People from Ekiti State
Nigerian expatriates in the United Kingdom
Alumni of the University of London
20th-century Nigerian medical doctors
Burials in Ekiti State
Christ's School, Ado Ekiti alumni